Suldal is a municipality in the northeast corner of Rogaland county, Norway. It is located in the traditional district of Ryfylke. Since 1965, the administrative centre of Suldal is the village of Sand i Ryfylke (prior to that it was the village of Suldalsosen). Other villages in Suldal include Haugsland, Jelsa, Marvik, Nesflaten, and Suldalsosen.

The  municipality is the 46th largest by area out of the 356 municipalities in Norway. Suldal is the 208th most populous municipality in Norway with a population of 3,784.

General information

The parish of Suledal was established as a municipality on 1 January 1838 (see formannskapsdistrikt law). In 1842, the northern district of the municipality (population: 1,584) was separated to become the new municipality of Søvde. This left Suldal with 2,030 residents. During the 1960s, there were many municipal mergers across Norway due to the work of the Schei Committee. On 1 January 1965, Suldal (population: 1,412) was merged with the neighboring municipalities of Sand (population: 1,135) and Erfjord (population: 610) as well as all of the municipality of Jelsa except for the parts on the island of Ombo (population: 928) and the parts of Imsland municipality located south of the Vindafjorden (population: 61). On 1 January 1978, the parts of Vikedal municipality located southeast of the Vindafjorden on the Ropeid peninsula (population: 13) was transferred to Suldal.

Name
The Old Norse form of the name was Súladalr. The first element is probably the plural genitive case of súla which means "pillar" or "column" (and then referring to the mountain pass Suldalsporten) and the last element is dalr which means "valley" or "dale". Before 1891, the name was written "Suledal".

Coat of arms
The coat of arms was granted on 11 March 1976. The arms show three wavy, yellow lines in bend on a red background. The lines represent the local river Suldalslågen which runs through the municipality.

Churches
The Church of Norway has four parishes within the municipality of Suldal. It is part of the Ryfylke prosti (deanery) in the Diocese of Stavanger.

History

The area that is now Suldal municipality has a long history of trade connections to the nearby valley regions to the north and east. The main mountain plateau trade route led east from Suldal municipality over the plateau to the nearby Setesdal valley in Bykle municipality in Agder county. Another route led north from Suldal in Rogaland county through the Røldal area in Vestland county, and then east into Vinje municipality in Vestfold og Telemark county. There has also been found Viking artefacts and graves in Suldal.

Geography
At , Suldal is the largest municipality in Rogaland county. The municipality borders three counties: Vestland (north), Vestfold og Telemark (northeast), and Agder (east). To the north, Suldal is bordered by Sauda and Ullensvang municipalities, in the east by Vinje and Bykle, in the south by Hjelmeland, and in the west by Vindafjord. Across the Jelsafjorden and Vindafjorden lie the municipalities of Stavanger and Tysvær.

The mountain Kistenuten is located at the triple border point of Rogaland, Vestland and Vestfold og Telemark. Other mountains in Suldal are Vassdalseggi, the highest mountain in Rogaland, Trollaskeinuten, Snønuten, Mælen, Knoda, Fitjanuten, Leirnuten, Kaldafjellet, Simlenuten, Steinkilenuten, and Raudberga, all reaching above  m.a.s.l.

The Sandsfjorden and Hylsfjorden lie within Suldal, as does lake Suldalsvatnet. The Saudafjorden lies partially within the boundary of Suldal. The Erfjorden and the lakes Blåsjø, Holmavatnet, and Holmevatnet also lie on the boundary of Suldal.

Economy
The Ulla-Førre project of building huge hydroelectric dams in the mountains was initiated in the 1960s. At times, the project employed over a thousand people.

Government
All municipalities in Norway, including Suldal, are responsible for primary education (through 10th grade), outpatient health services, senior citizen services, unemployment and other social services, zoning, economic development, and municipal roads. The municipality is governed by a municipal council of elected representatives, which in turn elect a mayor.  The municipality falls under the Haugaland og Sunnhordland District Court and the Gulating Court of Appeal.

Municipal council
The municipal council of Suldal is made up of 19 representatives that are elected to four year terms. Currently, the party breakdown is as follows:

Notable people 
 Rasmus Løland (1861 at Ryfylke – 1907) a Norwegian journalist, novelist and children's writer
 Trygve Fjetland (1926 in Jelsa – 2013) a Norwegian businessperson
 Hilde Sandvik (born 1970 in Erfjord) a Norwegian journalist 
 Inger Bråtveit (born 1978) a Norwegian novelist and children's writer, grew up in Suldal

References

External links
 
 
 
 Municipal fact sheet from Statistics Norway 
 Map hiking
 Ryfylke tourist bureau

 
Municipalities of Rogaland
1838 establishments in Norway